Islamic toilet etiquette is a set of personal hygiene rules in Islam that concerns going to the toilet. This code of Islamic hygienical jurisprudence is called Qaḍāʾ al-Ḥāǧa.

Personal hygiene is mentioned in a single verse of al-Qurʾan in the context of ritual purification from a minor source of impurity, known as the Wuḍūʾ verse; its interpretation is contentious between different legal schools and sects of Islam. Further requirements with regards to personal hygiene are derived from ahadith, and these requirements also differ between sects.

Rules

A Muslim must first find an acceptable place away from standing water, people's pathways, or shade. It is advised that it is better to enter the area with the left foot, facing away from the Qibla (direction of prayer towards Mecca). It is reported in the collection of hadith, Sahih al-Bukhari, that just before entering the toilet, Muhammad said . Following his example, Muslims are advised to say this Dua before entering into the toilet.

While on the toilet, one must remain silent. Talking, and initiating or answering greetings are strongly discouraged. When defecating together, two men cannot converse, nor look at each other's genitals. Eating any food while on the toilet is forbidden.

After defecating, the anus must be washed with water using the left hand, or if water is unavailable, with an odd number of smooth stones or pebbles called jamrah or hijaarah (Sahih Al-Bukhari 161, Book 4, Hadith 27). It is now more common to wipe with tissues and water. Similarly, the penis or vulva must be washed with water using the left hand after urinating, a procedure called istinja. It is commonly done using a vessel known as a Aftabeh, Lota, or bodna.

When leaving the toilet, one is advised to exit with the right foot, and say the Dua for leaving bathroom/toilet: "'الحمد لله الذي أذهب عني الأذى وعافاني'Alhamdu lillahil lazi azha-ba annill Aza Wa AA Fani.
"Praise be to Allah who relieved me of the filth and gave me relief."

See also
 Ghusl
 Wudu
 Asher yatzar, a Jewish blessing after, e.g., defecation
 Bidet shower
 Lota (vessel)
 Squat toilet

References

External links
 Islamic toilet etiquette in the hadith and fiqh (Islamic jurisprudence)
  - HOW TO USE A LOTA: THE SECRET TO ISLAMIC HYGIENE.

Etiquette by situation
Islamic jurisprudence
Toilet etiquett
Excretion
Sanitation